South Parks Road is a road in Oxford, England. It runs east–west past the main Science Area of the University of Oxford. Many of the university science departments are located nearby or face the road, including parts of the geography, zoology, chemistry, psychology and physiology departments. Also on the road is Rhodes House.

To the west, the road adjoins Parks Road at a T junction with the Radcliffe Science Library just to the north. To the east, the road bends sharply south at Linacre College and becomes St Cross Road. A cycle route continues east towards New Marston, crossing the River Cherwell. About halfway along South Parks Road, Mansfield Road adjoins to the south. Mansfield College is close to South Parks Road in this section.

In December 2018 it was announced that the proposed new graduate college of the University, Parks College, opening in September 2020, will be located on South Parks Road.

The road has been the scene of protests by animal rights protesters because of a new animal testing facility that has been built here. Pro-Test has been formed in reaction to the activities of the animal rights movement.

Halifax House
Halifax House was located at 8 South Parks Road on the corner with Mansfield Road from 1961, a social club for people associated with Oxford University. The building has since been demolished to make way for new science facilities for the University. Evidence of Bronze Age barrows together with later prehistoric and early Roman field systems has been found on the site.

See also
 Hooke Library
 Isis Innovation
 Physical and Theoretical Chemistry Laboratory
 Sir William Dunn School of Pathology
 Radcliffe Science Library
 Rhodes House
 Department of Plant Sciences, University of Oxford
 Department of Zoology, University of Oxford

References

Streets in Oxford
Rhodes House